Lyle Florenz Talbot (born Lisle Henderson, also credited Lysle Talbot; February 8, 1902 – March 2, 1996) was an American stage, screen and television actor. His career in films spanned three decades, from 1931 to 1960, and he performed on a wide variety of television series from the early 1950s to the late 1980s. Among his notable roles on television was his portrayal of Ozzie Nelson's friend and neighbor Joe Randolph, a character he played for ten years on the ABC sitcom The Adventures of Ozzie and Harriet.

Talbot began his film career under contract with Warner Bros. during the early years of the sound era. Ultimately, he appeared in more than 175 productions with various studios, first as a young matinee idol, then as the star of many B movies, and later as a character actor. He was a founding member of the Screen Actors Guild and in 1933 served on that organization's first board of directors. His long career is recounted in the 2012 book The Entertainer: Movies, Magic and My Father's Twentieth Century by his youngest daughter Margaret Talbot, a staff writer for The New Yorker.

Early life 
Lyle was born in Pittsburgh, Pennsylvania, the only child of Florence May (née Talbot) and Joel Edward Henderson, both natives of Nebraska. In May 1902, just three months after Lyle's birth, Florence died at her mother's home in Brainard, Nebraska from complications attributed to typhoid fever. Lyle was then raised in Brainard by his grandmother, Mary Talbot, who legally changed her infant grandson's surname from Henderson to her own and added "Florenz" as his middle name in memory of her daughter. Later, as a teenager, Talbot moved with his grandmother to Omaha, Nebraska. There he graduated from high school before leaving home at age 17 to work as a hypnotist's assistant, part-time magician, and as an actor, entertaining audiences at traveling tent shows and in theatres across the American Midwest.

Film career
After gaining years of stage experience in his travels, Talbot in 1929 established his own theatre company, "The Talbot Players", in Memphis, Tennessee, where he hired his father and stepmother, Anna Henderson, to be among the company's roster of performers. At the end of 1931, however, Talbot decided to move to California to find more lucrative acting opportunities in motion pictures. He already had some experience, though very limited, in performing on screen, namely in small roles in a few shorts, which included a bit part as a gangster in The Nightingale (1931) and playing a police captain in The Clyde Mystery (1931). Both of those low-budget, two-reel shorts were filmed in New York City and produced by Warner Bros. in affiliation with Vitaphone in Brooklyn.

Move to Hollywood, 1932
Talbot's arrival in California at the beginning of 1932 proved to be ideal timing, for Hollywood was still in the formative years of the sound era, when studios remained busy searching for potential leading actors who were not only engaging performers, but also had acceptable voices and articulate speech patterns for the early audio technologies being used and refined on film sets. Talbot possessed those qualities, for his screen test at Warner Bros. went well despite the fact that the scene Talbot performed was from a play that satirized the studio's production chief Darryl F. Zanuck. It also impressed one of the studio's top directors, "Wild Bill" William Wellman, who immediately wanted to cast the 30-year-old actor in his upcoming film Love Is a Racket. Talbot quickly accepted Zanuck's offer to join the company's growing ranks of contract players, who included the rising stars Bette Davis and Humphrey Bogart. Just prior to his work in Love Is a Racket, Talbot appeared as a major supporting character, Dr. Jerome Preston, in Unholy Love, a drama produced by Warner Bros. in cooperation with Albert Ray Productions. Lyle's portrayal of "Jerry" did not go unnoticed by film industry trade publications. In its July 9, 1932 review of Unholy Love, the popular journal Motion Picture Herald encourages theater owners and prospective audiences to direct special attention on three performers in the film: "Don't overlook Beryl Mercer and Ivan Lebedeff, as well as Lyle Talbot, "whom Warner Brothers are grooming for stellar roles."

Some other notable films in which Talbot was cast in his first years at Warner Bros. are Three on a Match (1932), 20,000 Years in Sing Sing (1932) with Spencer Tracy, College Coach (1933) with Pat O'Brien and Dick Powell, Mary Stevens, M.D. (1933), Ladies They Talk About, and Mandalay (1934) where he portrays an alcoholic doctor trying to quit drinking. He continued to perform in a variety of co-starring roles, such as romancing Mae West in Go West, Young Man (1936), pursuing opera star Grace Moore in One Night of Love (1934), and playing a bank robber on the run in Heat Lightning (1934).

He appeared opposite an array of other stars during his career, including Bette Davis, Ann Dvorak, Carole Lombard, Barbara Stanwyck, Mary Astor, Ginger Rogers, Loretta Young, Glenda Farrell, Joan Blondell, Marion Davies, and Shirley Temple. He also shared the screen with Humphrey Bogart, Spencer Tracy and Tyrone Power. Overall the course of his entertainment career, Talbot performed in over 175 films.

"The 42nd Street Special" and "cheap socks"
Early in his career at Warner Bros., Talbot took part in one of Hollywood's most extravagant and ambitious publicity events, a five-week rail trip in 1933 across the United States with Bette Davis, Preston Foster, Leo Carrillo, cowboy star Tom Mix, Olympic swimmer Eleanor Holm, comedian Joe E. Brown, and a chorus line of Busby Berkeley dancers. The established studio celebrities and rising stars and personnel traveled aboard "The 42nd Street Special," a passenger train that was elaborately decorated in silver and gold leaf and trimmed with electric lights. Stopping at dozens of cities along their journey, the Hollywood travelers widely promoted Warners' new Busby Berkeley musical 42nd Street. They also took the opportunity when the train paused in Washington, D.C. on March 4, 1933, to attend the first inauguration of Franklin Delano Roosevelt as a show of the studio's support for the nation's new president. Days later, after arriving in New York City on March 9, the train returned to California. In the extensive news coverage of The 42nd Street Special's itinerary, Talbotalready  divorced from a brief marriage in 1930was described in reports as the train's "Railway Romeo" and as being "'handsome as hell'" and "'likable as a collie.'" Warner Bros. was evidently very pleased with his performances for the studio, both on- and off-set, for during the publicity excursion, the New York-based trade paper The Film Daily reports on March 1, "Lyle Talbot, now on the '42nd Street' special train touring the country, has been placed under long-term contract by Warners."

The monthly movie-fan magazine Photoplay profiled Talbot in its March 1933 issue, distributing it to its subscribers and newsstands at the same time the 42nd Street Special was still touring the nation.  Written by Sara Hamilton and titled "Born to be a Villain But Lyle Talbot wishes they would let him go straight", the article provided readers with some insight into the popular actor's general lifestyle at the time, along with some details about his early life and personal preferences, right down to his "cheap socks":

SAG and later films
Back in Hollywood after the 1933 publicity tour and working long hours six days a week, Talbot in July 1933 decided to become a member of the first board of directors of the Screen Actors Guild. His activism in SAG union affairs reportedly hurt his career. In 1936, Warner Bros. dropped his contract, which immediately affected Talbot's acting opportunities. He seldom received starring roles again, although he continued to find steady work as a capable character actor, often playing the "other man", affable neighbors, or crafty villains with equal finesse. Talbot's supporting roles spanned the gamut, as he played cowboys, pirates, detectives, street cops, surgeons, psychiatrists, soldiers, judges, newspaper editors, storekeepers, and boxers. In reflecting on his career during a 1984 interview with the Los Angeles Times, he stated, "'It's really simple, I never turned down a job, not one...ever.'" Such universal acceptance of acting offers led to his performing in, as Talbot himself described them in the same Times interview, "'some real stinkers'". Those films include three by Ed Wood that are now distinguished in American cinematic history for their extraordinarily low production values: Glen or Glenda (1953), Jail Bait (1954), and a motion picture often cited by media reviewers as the "'worst film ever made'", Plan 9 from Outer Space (1959). Talbot also worked with the Three Stooges in Gold Raiders (1951) and played villains in four comedies with The Bowery Boys.

Talbot was notable too for being the first live-action actor to play two prominent DC Comics characters on-screen: Commissioner Gordon in Batman and Robin, and supervillain Lex Luthor in Atom Man vs. Superman (who at the time was simply known as Luthor). Talbot began a longstanding tradition of actors in these roles that were most recently (as of 2022) filled by Jeffrey Wright and Jesse Eisenberg, respectively.

In 1960, after an absence of more than 20 years, Talbot returned to the Warner Bros. big screen, appearing in the Franklin D. Roosevelt bio-pic, Sunrise at Campobello written by Dore Schary and starring Ralph Bellamy. It was Talbot's penultimate film appearance.

Return to the stage
Having started his career in the theatre and later co-starred on Broadway in 1940–1941 in Separate Rooms with Glenda Farrell and Alan Dinehart, Talbot returned to the stage in the 1960s and 1970s, starring in national road company versions of Thornton Wilder's The Matchmaker with Ann B. Davis; Gore Vidal's The Best Man with Hugh Marlowe and K.T. Stevens; Neil Simon's The Odd Couple and Barefoot in the Park; Arthur Sumner Long's play Never Too Late with Penny Singleton; 
and appearing as Captain Brackett in a 1967 revival of South Pacific at (Lincoln Center) starring Florence Henderson and Giorgio Tozzi. He also starred in Preston Jones' "The Last Meeting of the Knights of the White Magnolia" at the Alley Theatre in Houston and the Chicago area Lincolnshire Theater. He rode the wave of the dinner theater phenomenon in the 1970s, acting in light comedies onstage in various Midwestern towns where former television actors were major attractions. As early as 1962, Talbot directed and co-starred with Ozzie and Harriet Nelson and a young Sally "Hot Lips" Kellerman in Marriage Go Round, a play Talbot and the Nelsons took on the road again in the early 1970s.

Television, 1950s1980s
Although Talbot once starred in the film Trapped by Television (1936), the invention of TV actually revived his acting career after the quality of his movie roles began to decline. Talbot was a frequent presence on American television from the 1950s well into the 1970s with occasional appearances in the 1980s. From 1955 to 1966, he regularly appeared in episodes of The Adventures of Ozzie and Harriet as neighbor Joe Randolph. He also had a recurring role (1955–58) as Paul Fonda in numerous episodes of The Bob Cummings Show.

Talbot also acted in a variety of early television Westerns. He played Colonel Billings three times on The Adventures of Kit Carson (1951–1955), appeared four times as a judge on the syndicated series The Cisco Kid, guest-starred in four episodes of Gene Autry's The Range Rider in 1952 and 1953, was cast five times in different roles on The Lone Ranger between 1950 and 1955, and played Sheriff Clyde Chadwick in the 1959 episode "The Sanctuary" on Colt .45, and the episode "Two Tickets to Ten Strike" on Maverick in 1959. In the 1950s and beyond, he performed as well in a wide range of other drama and comedy programs. In 1955 he portrayed the character Baylor in six episodes or "chapters" of the early sci-fi series Commando Cody: Sky Marshal of the Universe. From 1953 to 1957, he was cast as different characters in four episodes of the anthology series Lux Video Theatre. In 1967, he played Colonel Blake three times on The Beverly Hillbillies and appeared three times between 1965 and 1971 on Green Acres.  On one episode of Green Acres Talbot played himself but in the fictional role of a senator, spoofing actors such as Ronald Reagan who actually became politicians later in their careers.

Some examples of other series on which Talbot made guest appearances include Annie Oakley; It's a Great Life; The Public Defender; The Pride of the Family; Crossroads; Hey, Jeannie!; The George Burns and Gracie Allen Show; Broken Arrow; The Millionaire; Richard Diamond, Private Detective; Tales of Wells Fargo; Buckskin; Cimarron City;  Maverick; Angel; Hawaiian Eye; 77 Sunset Strip; Surfside 6; The Roaring 20s; The Restless Gun; Stagecoach West; The Red Skelton Show; The Lucy Show, The Adventures of Wild Bill Hickok; Topper; The Adventures of Rin Tin Tin; Laredo; Perry Mason; The Real McCoys; Rawhide; Wagon Train; Charlie's Angels; Newhart; The Dukes of Hazzard; St. Elsewhere; Adam-12, and Who's the Boss?.

Talbot continued to act on television into the 1980s. He also narrated at that time two televised PBS biographies, The Case of Dashiell Hammett (1982) and World Without Walls (1986) about pioneering female pilot Beryl Markham. Both PBS programs were produced and written by his son Stephen Talbot, a former child actor who portrayed the recurring character Gilbert Bates on Leave It to Beaver, another series on which his father performed in several episodes.

Personal life and death
Talbot had many romantic entanglements and several brief marriages to Elaine Melchoir (1930), Marguerite Cramer (1937–1940), Abigail Adams (1942), and Keven "Eve" McClure (1946–1947) who next married novelist Henry Miller. Talbot married for the fifth time and final time in 1948 to Margaret Epple, a young actress and singer who adopted the name "Paula" and sometimes went by the stage names of "Paula Deaven" or "Margaret Abbott." She was 20; he was a 46-year-old actor with a drinking problem. 
Under Paula's influence, Talbot quit drinking, and the couple often performed together on stage in summer stock and community theater. They had four children, lived in Studio City, California (where Talbot was honorary mayor in the 1960s), and remained married for more than 40 years, until Paula's death in 1989.

After his wife's death, Talbot moved to San Francisco, where both of his sons and their families lived. On March 2, 1996, Talbot died at the age of 94 at his home in San Francisco, California. His death was attributed to congestive heart failure. He was survived by his children, three of whomStephen Talbot, David Talbot, and Margaret Talbothad established careers in media production, writing, or journalism. Cynthia Talbot, Lyle's elder daughter, instead pursued a medical career, becoming a physician and later a residency director in Portland, Oregon.

Filmography

Notes

References

External links

 
 

|- 
|  style="width:35%; text-align:center;"| First
|  style="width:30%; text-align:center;"| Actors portraying Lex Luthor1950'''for Atom Man vs. Superman|  style="width:35%; text-align:center;"| Succeeded byGene Hackmanfor Superman, Superman II andSuperman IV: The Quest for Peace''

1902 births
1996 deaths
Male actors from Nebraska
American male stage actors
American male film actors
American male television actors
People from Butler County, Nebraska
20th-century American male actors